Khirbet al-Hamam is a village in Syria located in the Homs District, Homs Governorate. According to the Syria Central Bureau of Statistics, Khirbet al-Hamam had a population of 4,817 in the 2004 census.

References

Populated places in Homs District
Alawite communities in Syria